The 1924 Stanford football team represented Stanford University in the 1924 college football season. Stanford's first year head coach was Pop Warner, hired from Pittsburgh, where he had led the Panthers to three national championships.

Under Warner, Stanford won its first Pacific Coast Conference championship led by Ernie Nevers, who would later be inducted into both the future College Football Hall of Fame and the Pro Football Hall of Fame. Stanford was undefeated in the regular season and advanced its second ever postseason appearance, but lost to Notre Dame in the 1925 Rose Bowl.

Schedule

Season summary

The team played its home games at Stanford Stadium in Stanford, California, but had the unusual circumstance of playing an additional "home" game at California Memorial Stadium in Berkeley, California, home of rival California. The situation occurred after Stanford and California, convinced that fellow PCC member USC was guilty of recruiting violations, announced they would sever athletic ties with USC. In response, USC canceled its upcoming away game at Stanford, leaving Stanford with a hole in its schedule. Concerned that one fewer game would jeopardize the team's chance to win the conference, Stanford hurriedly scheduled a last-minute game with Utah. However, since Stanford Stadium was already reserved by the freshman team, California agreed to let Stanford play the game in Berkeley, which Stanford dominated, 30–0.

Stanford returned to Berkeley as the visiting team two weeks later for the Big Game to determine the PCC championship, facing off against defending PCC champion California, who was also undefeated and had won the past five Big Games. In fact, Stanford had not won a Big Game since 1914, when both teams were still playing rugby instead of football. Stanford rallied from a 14-point fourth quarter deficit to force a 20–20 tie and win the conference championship.

After winning the PCC, Stanford faced Notre Dame in the 1925 Rose Bowl. Eight turnovers doomed Stanford to a 27–10 loss to the Irish, which was led by coach Knute Rockne and the backfield known as The Four Horsemen of Notre Dame. This was the first meeting of the teams, which began a rivalry series that continues to this day.

References

Stanford
Stanford Cardinal football seasons
Pac-12 Conference football champion seasons
Stanford football